Mathias Sinamenye is an Economist by profession and became 2nd Vice-President of Burundi from 12 June 1998 to 1 November 2001. Previously he was the governor of the central bank of Burundi from 1992 to 1998. He is a member of the Tutsi ethnic group.

On 12 June 1998, he was appointed 2nd Vice-President (responsible for economic and social affairs), by Interim President Pierre Buyoya. He held that post until a new power-sharing government was installed on 1 November 2001.

After Vice Presidency, he was appointed Executive Director of the World Bank Group in charge of the African region.

References

Year of birth missing (living people)
Living people
Tutsi people
Vice-presidents of Burundi
Governors of Bank of the Republic of Burundi
Union for National Progress politicians